John Richardson is an American former Negro league third baseman who played in the 1920s.

Richardson made his Negro leagues debut in 1922 with the Hilldale Club. He went on to play for the Birmingham Black Barons in 1924.

References

External links
 and Baseball-Reference Black Baseball stats and Seamheads

Year of birth missing
Place of birth missing
Birmingham Black Barons players
Hilldale Club players
Baseball third basemen